The Vicinamibacteraceae is a family of Acidobacteriota.

Phylogeny
The currently accepted taxonomy is based on the List of Prokaryotic names with Standing in Nomenclature and the phylogeny is based on 16S rRNA sequences. Numbered orders and families do not yet have any cultured representatives.

References

Acidobacteriota
Bacteria families